The 1983 Canada rugby union tour of England, was a series of five matches played by the Canada national rugby union team in Englandin October 1983. The Canadian team won two of their tour matches, and lost the other three. 

Canadian lost the match against England, (Rugby Football Union did not award full international cap)

Results 
Scores and results list Canada's points tally first.

Canada rugby union tour
Canada national rugby union team tours
Rugby union tours of England
tour
tour